Cordes-Vindrac is a railway station in Vindrac-Alayrac, Occitanie, France. The station is on the Brive-Toulouse (via Capdenac) railway line. The station is served by TER (local) services operated by SNCF.

Train services
The following services call at Cordes-Vindrac:
Local service (TER Occitanie) Toulouse–Figeac–Aurillac

References

Railway stations in Tarn (department)